Henry Clay Hart III (July 1, 1936 – July 28, 2022) was an American country music singer and guitarist who was a member of The Lawrence Welk Show television program from 1969 to 1975.

Biography
Born Henry Clay Hart, III, and reared in Providence, Rhode Island; he attended Amherst College in Amherst, Massachusetts as a theater arts major. Although his passion was in music, he worked as a salesman in a record shop in New York City after graduation and later as a foreign credit analyst on Wall Street but those jobs were brief, for he proceeded to pursue a music career, often performing in small clubs.

While performing in West Virginia, Hart was discovered by Lawrence Welk who was there for a luncheon on behalf of the Cancer Crusade. Impressed with his talent, the maestro signed him as a member of the Champagne Music Makers, where he made his first network television appearance in July 1969.

Hart replaced Lynn Anderson as the show's resident country singer and remained on the show in that capacity until 1975. During Hart's time on the show, he was nominated for the Grammy Award for Best Male Country Vocal Performance for his 1969 single "Spring", but lost to Johnny Cash.

He released a solo album, Clay Hart: Most Requested Country Favorites from the Ranwood Records label. For several years Hart focused on concert tours and was not recording, but in 1973 he worked with Tommy Alsop to release a new recording from Ranwood.

Hart married Sally Flynn, on December 6, 1974. Flynn had been a vocalist on the Welk show until 1972. The two later became a country singing duo that has opened for stars such as Mel Tillis, Red Skelton, and Juliet Prowse. The couple later taped wraparound segments for reruns of the Welk Show on PBS and have toured the US with their fellow Welk stars in the Forever Blowing Bubbles concert series.

Hart had two children, Elizabeth and Hank, from a previous marriage. Since the show, he had appeared on The Nashville Network, and had  operated a tote bag business with Flynn. They made their home in Cocoa Beach, Florida until his death in 2022.

Discography

Albums

Singles

References 

1936 births
2022 deaths
American country singer-songwriters
Country musicians from Rhode Island
Musicians from Providence, Rhode Island
Singers from New York City
Singers from Los Angeles
Musicians from Miami
Lawrence Welk
Singer-songwriters from California
Singer-songwriters from New York (state)
Singer-songwriters from Florida